Servius Fulvius Flaccus was a member of the Roman gens Fulvia.

He came from the Roman plebs family Fulvia and was consul in 135 BC. He put down an uprising among the Ardiaei in Illyria. Cicero described him as a literary and elegant man. He was, however, accused of incest and was defended by Gaius Curio.

References

Servius
2nd-century BC Roman consuls